Johan Voskamp (born 15 October 1984) is a Dutch footballer who plays as a striker for VV LYRA.

Career

Voskamp has previously played for Helmond Sport, Excelsior Rotterdam and RKC Waalwijk. He signed for relegated Jupiler League side Sparta Rotterdam ahead of the 2010–11 campaign, but missed the club's first game of the season, a 2–1 win away at Go Ahead Eagles. He made his debut a week later against newly named Almere City, scoring eight goals on his debut in a 12–1 win.
He ended up the league's top goalscorer in what was a dismal season for the Rotterdammers.

In July 2011, he joined Śląsk Wrocław on a three-year contract. He made his debut on 14 July as a substitute against Dundee United in the Europa League second qualifying round first leg and scored the only goal of the game giving his team a 1–0 win.

On 31 July 2011 he debuted, yet again as a substitute, in the Ekstraklasa, where he scored a goal securing his team a 1–1 against Górnik Zabrze.

On 7 June 2013, Voskamp signed a three-year contract with his former team Sparta Rotterdam.

Honours

Club
Śląsk Wrocław
 Ekstraklasa: 2011-12

Sparta Rotterdam
 Eerste Divisie: 2015-16

References

External links
 Voetbal International profile 
 

1984 births
Living people
Dutch footballers
Dutch expatriate footballers
Excelsior Rotterdam players
RKC Waalwijk players
Helmond Sport players
Sparta Rotterdam players
Śląsk Wrocław players
Eredivisie players
Eerste Divisie players
Ekstraklasa players
Expatriate footballers in Poland
Association football forwards
People from De Lier
Footballers from South Holland